Joan Edelman Goody (December 1, 1935 – 8 September 2009) was an American architect based in Boston, Massachusetts, where she served on the faculty of the Mayor's Institute for City Design, and earlier as chair of the Boston Civic Design Commission. She was known for her influence in the latter part of the 20th and early 21st century on Boston modern architecture and historic preservation.
She was also the author of several books on architecture, including an early work on the emerging modern style in Boston, New Architecture in Boston.

Goody was a Fellow of the American Institute of Architects and a principal of Goody, Clancy & Associates, Inc of Boston.

Early life and education 
Joan Edelman Goody was born in Brooklyn, New York in 1935 and grew up in the Flatbush neighborhood of Brooklyn. She attended the School of the Ethical Culture Society.Campbell, Robert,"Joan Goody, 73, noted architect, cultural leader in Boston", The Boston Globe, September 13, 2009.

Ms. Goody attended Cornell University. She spent her junior year studying in Paris, France and she went to Granada, Spain on Spring break in 1955 where she developed an immediate interest in architecture after seeing and visiting the Alhambra. She graduated Phi Beta Kappa from Cornell University in 1956. She went on to study and receive a Masters Degree in architecture and design at the Harvard Graduate School of Design.

Career 
She married Marvin Goody, an MIT professor and architect in Boston and joined his firm, becoming a partner in 1968. Joan Goody taught architectural design at Harvard in the 1970s.

Personal life 
Joan Edelman married Marvin Goody, a fellow architect, in 1960. She remained married to him until his death in 1980.

In 1984, she married Peter Davison, a poet and editor, and remained married to him until his death in 2004.

Selected projects  
 restoration of Trinity Church at Copley Square in Boston, Massachusetts, including the creation of a major gathering area in a former cramped basement
 Harbor Point Apartments, where she transformed a dismal public housing project into a mixed-income neighborhood on the Columbia Point peninsula in the Dorchester neighborhood of Boston, Massachusetts
 a federal courthouse in Wheeling, West Virginia, where she mixed modern with traditional motifs 
 Salomon Center for Teaching at Brown University 
 Heaton Court, a small, affordable housing cluster in Stockbridge, Massachusetts 
 conversion of the former St. Elizabeth’s Hospital in Washington, D.C. into a new headquarters for the Department of Homeland Security.

Publications 

New Architecture in Boston, MIT Press; 1965
"Essays on social housing", Progressive Architecture 7 (1984), pp. 82–87
"Do you see new directions?", Architecture: the AIA journal 5 (1985), pp. 240–251, 312–320
 Columbia Point: A New Vision (c.1991) Boston Society of Architects, Joan E. Goody, Chair of Committee. In the collection of the Boston Public Library

References

External links 

 Boston Society for Architecture. “Joan Goody FAIA (2002).” Accessed October 25, 2021.
 Campbell, Robert, “Joan Goody, FAIA”, Architectural Record. (Oct 2009): p 38. (See Boston Globe obituary by Robert Campbell)
 Goody, Joan E., “A Rare and Rich Response to Context: Keio University Library, Tokyo, Japan,” Architectural Record Volume, no. 5 (1983): p 106-113.

1935 births
2009 deaths
20th-century American architects
Modernist architects
Fellows of the American Institute of Architects
American women architects
20th-century American women
21st-century American women
Cornell University alumni
Harvard Graduate School of Design alumni